Haya Kaspi (born 6 October 1948) is an Israeli operations researcher, statistician, and probability theorist. She is a professor emeritus of industrial engineering and management at the Technion – Israel Institute of Technology.

Education and career
Kaspi was born in HaOgen. She earned a bachelor's degree in mathematics at the Hebrew University of Jerusalem in 1971, and a master's degree in applied mathematics at the Technion – Israel Institute of Technology in 1974. Next, she went to the US for her doctoral studies, completing a Ph.D. in operations research at Cornell University in 1979. Her dissertation, Ladder Sets of Markov Additive Processes, was supervised by N. U. Prabhu.

After postdoctoral study at Princeton University, she returned to the Technion in 1980 as a lecturer. She was promoted to full professor in 1997.

Recognition
In 2008, Kaspi was selected as a Fellow of the Institute of Mathematical Statistics "for contributions to the general theory of Markov processes and its applications, to the theory of Markov local time; and for excellence in teaching and editorial work".
for their joint work on permanental point processes (processes whose joint intensity can be represented as a permanent).

References

External links
Home page

1948 births
Living people
Israeli mathematicians
Israeli statisticians
Women mathematicians
Women statisticians
Operations researchers
Probability theorists
Technion – Israel Institute of Technology alumni
Hebrew University of Jerusalem alumni
Cornell University alumni
Fellows of the Institute of Mathematical Statistics